Foreign relations exist between Azerbaijan and Romania. The countries have established embassies in their respective capitals. The Azeri president visited Romania in October 2004 and the two nations have signed over fifty separate agreements to date.

History

Romania officially recognized Azerbaijan's independence on December 11, 1991. The Embassy of Romania in Azerbaijan was opened on November 3, 1998, and Embassy of Azerbaijan in Romania on May 19, 2001. Daniel Cristian Ciobanu is an ambassador of Romania in Azerbaijan and Farid Abdinbayov is an ambassador of Azerbaijan in Romania appointed by decree of Azerbaijani president dated June 27, 2013.

The two countries established diplomatic relations on June 19, 1992. While the two share mutual areas in multiple areas, the main focus has been on trade and energy links, with trade delegations and frequent talks regarding the further development of such ties and an increase in bilateral trade since trade originating from Azerbaijan approximately five times the quantity ($161 million) of those from Romania ($31.83 million).

As an existing member, Romania has been a strong advocate of Azerbaijan's future membership of the North Atlantic Treaty Organization (NATO), pointing out the strategic importance of the country for trade and shipping, particularly with a view towards Afghanistan.

Agreements
In 2000, Azerbaijan and Romania signed an agreement on bilateral defence cooperation, followed by a similar agreement on information sharing in 2004. In December 2007, a Romanian energy delegation visited Azerbaijan. The two parties discussed a gas pipeline and emphasised the importance of the two nations' cooperation in order to provide "energy security in Europe".

State visits
In 2004, the Azeri president made a two-day state visit to Romania, during which time, the two leaders held private meetings on a range of issues, including, inter alia, the relationship between the two countries and opportunities for cooperation on counter- terrorism. Eleven separate were signed as a result of these meetings. Also during this visit, the president officially opened a new embassy building, emphasising the role of the embassy in the continuation and development of relations between the nations.

High-level mutual visits

Presidents

Prime Ministers

Chairmen of Parliament

Documents

Political sphere

Resident diplomatic missions
 Azerbaijan has an embassy in Bucharest. 
 Romania has an embassy in Baku.

See also 
 Foreign relations of Azerbaijan
 Foreign relations of Romania
 Azerbaijan–EU relations
 Azerbaijanis in Romania
 Azerbaijanis in Moldova
 Azerbaijanis in Europe
 Romanians in Azerbaijan
 Armenia–Romania relations 
 Romania–Turkey relations

References

External links 
 Embassy of Romania in Azerbaijan Official website
 Embassy of Azerbaijan in Romania Official website
  Romanian Ministry of Foreign Affairs: direction of the Romanian embassy in Baku

 
Romania 
Bilateral relations of Romania